The 2015–16 Cal State Bakersfield Roadrunners men's basketball team represented California State University, Bakersfield during the 2015–16 NCAA Division I men's basketball season. The Roadrunners were led by fifth year head coach Rod Barnes and played their home games at the Icardo Center. The Roadrunners competed as members of the Western Athletic Conference. They finished the season 24–9, 11–3 in WAC play to finish in a tie for second place. They defeated Chicago State, Seattle, and New Mexico State to be champions of the WAC tournament. They earned the conference's automatic bid to the NCAA tournament, their first ever appearance, where they lost in the first round to Oklahoma.

Previous season 
The Roadrunners finished the season 14–19, 7–7 in WAC play to finish in a tie for fourth place. They advanced to the semifinals of the WAC tournament where they lost to New Mexico State.

Departures

2015 incoming recruits

2016 incoming recruits

Roster

Schedule

|-
!colspan=9 style="background:#005DAA; color:#FFD200;"| Exhibition

|-
!colspan=9 style="background:#005DAA; color:#FFD200;"| Non-conference regular season

|-
!colspan=9 style="background:#005DAA; color:#FFD200;"| WAC regular season

|-
!colspan=9 style="background:#005DAA; color:#FFD200;"| WAC tournament

|-
!colspan=9 style="background:#005DAA; color:#FFD200;"| NCAA tournament

References

Cal State Bakersfield Roadrunners men's basketball seasons
Cal State Bakersfield
Cal State Bakersfield